Strachowice may refer to the following places in Poland:
Strachowice, Legnica County in Gmina Legnickie Pole, Legnica County in Lower Silesian Voivodeship (SW Poland)
Strachowice, Wrocław osiedle in Wrocław
Wrocław-Strachowice Airport, another name for Wrocław–Copernicus Airport